Garudal-e Bala (also Romanized as Garūdal-e Bālā) is a village in Bahu Kalat Rural District, Dashtiari District, Chabahar County, Sistan and Baluchestan Province, Iran. At the 2006 census, its population was 45, in 8 families.

References 

Populated places in Chabahar County